Katz or KATZ may refer to:

Fiction
 Katz Kobayashi, a character in Japanese anime
 "Katz", a 1947 Nelson Algren story in The Neon Wilderness
 Katz, a character in Courage the Cowardly Dog

Other uses
Katz (surname)
Katz, British Columbia, an uninhabited official placename in Canada
Katz railway station, a Canadian Pacific Railway flag stop
KATZ (AM), a radio station (1600 AM) licensed to St. Louis, Missouri, United States
KATZ-FM, a radio station (100.3 FM) licensed to Bridgeton, Missouri
22981 Katz (1999 VN30), a main-belt asteroid
Katz Editores, an independent Argentine scholarly publisher
Katz syndrome, a rare congenital disorder
Katz Castle, St. Goarshausen, Rhineland-Palatinate, Germany
Katz Group of Companies, a Canadian retail pharmacy network
Joseph M. Katz School of Business, a Graduate School at the University of Pittsburgh in Pennsylvania

See also
 
Cats (disambiguation)
Kats (disambiguation)
Katsu (Zen)